S.  ("Muthu") Muthukrishnan is a computer scientist of Indian origin, known for his work in streaming algorithms, auction design, and pattern matching. He is vice president of sponsored products, Amazon (company) Advertising.

Previously, he was a professor of computer science at Rutgers University.

Education 
Muthukrishnan obtained his Ph.D. in 1994 New York University under the supervision of Krishna Palem and Joel Spencer.

Research contributions 
Muthukrishnan was general chair of the 1st ACM Conference on Online Social Networks. He was conference chair of the 5th IEEE International Conference on Data Mining (ICDM) in 2005 and co-chair of the 15th Annual Combinatorial Pattern Matching Symposium (CPM) in 2004.  He was the organizer of the Big Data Program at the Simons Center for Theoretical Computer Science.

Awards and honors
Muthukrishnan was inducted as an ACM Fellow in 2010 "For contributions to efficient algorithms for string matching, data streams, and internet ad auctions".  He received the 2014 Imre Simon Test-of-Time Award at the LATIN Conference.

Selected publications
.
.
.

References

External links
Google scholar profile

Year of birth missing (living people)
Living people
American computer scientists
Indian computer scientists
Theoretical computer scientists
New York University alumni
Rutgers University faculty
Fellows of the Association for Computing Machinery